Bert Anderson is an American politician and business owner who has served in the North Dakota House of Representatives since December 2014. He currently represents the 2nd district alongside Donald Longmuir. He is also the mayor of Crosby, North Dakota. Anderson is a member of the Republican Party.

Biography
Anderson attended Northwest Bible College and Lake Region College. In 1992, he established Bert's Woodwork. Anderson serves as the mayor of Crosby.

On December 1, 2014, Anderson was appointed to the North Dakota House of Representatives to represent the 2nd district after incumbent David Rust was elected to the state senate. Anderson and fellow Republican Donald Longmuir went on to win the November 2016 general election. Both are unopposed in November 2020.

Anderson is married to Dianne. They have two children and four grandchildren.

References

External links
Representative Bert Anderson – North Dakota Legislative Branch

Living people
Year of birth missing (living people)
Republican Party members of the North Dakota House of Representatives
21st-century American politicians